Beishatan Station is a station on Line 15 of the Beijing Subway. It was opened on December 28, 2014 as a part of the stretch between Wangjing West and Qinghuadongluxikou and is located between Olympic Green and Liudaokou stations.

Station layout 
The station has an underground island platform.

Exits
There are 4 exits, lettered A, B1, B2, and C. Exits B1 and C are accessible.

Gallery

References

Beijing Subway stations in Haidian District
Beijing Subway stations in Chaoyang District